General Meredith may refer to:

John Meredith (general) (1864–1942), Australian Imperial Force brigadier general
Solomon Meredith (1810–1875)

See also
Thomas Meredyth (after 1661–1719), British Army lieutenant general